David P. Flores is an American artist, muralist and product designer.

Early life 
David Flores was born in Tulare, California. He graduated High School from Tulare Union High School, attended college in Santa Barbara and left with a degree in graphic design.  After graduation Flores began his career as a commercial artist in the Skateboarding industry.

Early career 
Flores worked for Shorty's Skateboards as a freelance Illustrator and first became internationally published in the pages of Transworld Skateboarding magazine for his illustration of the Black Panthers skateboard bearing logo.

He also contributed to many other skateboarding companies such as Real, Stereo, Thunder, Doh Doh, BlackMagic, Anti Hero, Powell Peralta, Spitfire Wheels, Lucky Bearings, and Deluxe Distribution.

One earlier series of paintings, "Giants", depicted Giant Robots in the City of San Francisco. In 2000, Flores began to design and produce his own limited edition vinyl toys, clothing and paintings with the use of a new style coined "Stained Glass" by the artist himself.

One of Flores' early series, called Icons, was painted in 2000. This series included portraits and renderings in his style of the Mother Teresa, Pablo Picasso, Mos Def, Neil Armstrong, Jacques Cousteau, and Sophia Loren.  Flores explains that he "wanted to produce a body of work that was aesthetically pleasing with respect and a nod to artists, explorers and influential people of the past and present". Flores had also reworked other familiar icons such as Disney's Mickey Mouse and Thumper, both released as vinyl toys. As were the Michelin Man, Donald Duck, Mario Bros. and Homer Simpson, in addition to having graphic work shown on MTV's Fantasy Factory. He also had the Kidrobot toy, Dunny, inducted into the Museum of Modern Art.

Additional experience, collaborations and style 
Flores says his art was "an instant hit with the global urban art community especially in Japan", where he said his style was well respected and received. A collaborative toy and housewares project was created called "DFWORKS BEARBRICK" and "Fabrick" with Medicom Toy, in the Aoyama District of Tokyo.

Flores is best known for his self-proclaimed "Stained Glass" and mosaic or segmented style. The impact of Flores' graphic style comes in its ability to allow the viewer to reinterpret a popular image they already have associations with. Flores' murals, acrylic paintings and sculptures have many iconic images, including images of late artists such as Andy Warhol, Salvador Dalí, Jean-Michel Basquiat and Robert Crumb.

Flores has also participated in other commercial collaborations with photographer Phil Stern, Flip Skateboards, Medicom Toy Co., Shepard Fairey, Mural Collaboration, Akomplice Clothing, Disney for Block28, Stussy, Oakley Sunglasses (with a limited release in Japan), snowboard projects with M3, a rendition of Speedy Gonzales with Warner Brothers, "DFWORKS BEARBRICK" and "Fabrick" with Medicom Toy, Pro-series shoe with DC*SHOES, toys with XLARGE, Kidrobot, Delabarracuda LA, House of Pain, Remix Revista of Argentina, Chouette Luxury of Hong Kong and Simpsons limited edition sneakers with Vans (where he was illustrated as a Simpsons character) himself by Matt Groening.

Other exhibitions include Another Fine Mess (2011), Suede Gallery, photographer Phil Stern(2011), LA Destroyers NIKE Event, an exhibition in Hong Kong's Times Square with Disney's Block28 (2009), DFisXL Xlarge gallery Tokyo, Japan( 2006) and Solo at Gallery 1988 (2004).

References

1972 births
Living people
People from Tulare, California
Artists from California
American muralists